Zack Exley (born December 5, 1969) is an American political and technology consultant.

Early life and education 
Exley was raised in West Hartford, Connecticut. He studied abroad at Shanxi Normal University before earning his B.A. in Social Thought and Political Economy from the University of Massachusetts Amherst in 1993. He also attended the John F. Kennedy School of Government.

Career 
Around the 2000 election controversy, Exley used a website to allow citizens to self-organize more than 100 protests around the United States.

In 2004, he was the Director of Online Communications and Organizing on the John Kerry 2004 presidential campaign, and directed internet operations for the UK Labour Party's re-election campaign in 2005.

Exley served as the Chief Revenue Officer (formerly Chief Community Officer) at the Wikimedia Foundation from 2010 to 2013. He continued to provide contracted fundraising consultation until 2017. Before that, he worked at ThoughtWorks, a global IT consultancy. He is also the co-founder and former president of the New Organizing Institute, a progressive political technology training organization. Politico reported in August 2015 that Exley had joined the 2016 Bernie Sanders presidential campaign as a senior advisor responsible for digital communications. He co-founded the Justice Democrats and Brand New Congress.

Exley was Organizing Director at MoveOn.org during the group's campaign to prevent the Iraq War, and during its controversial involvement with the Howard Dean 2004 presidential campaign. He was criticized for "rigging" the "MoveOn Primary" in favor of Dean, a charge the group rejected.

Prior to working for MoveOn, Exley created the political parody website, GWBush.com, as well as cnndn.com, a site that parodied financial reporting. Both sites attracted legal action by Bush's 2000 election campaign and CNN, respectively. CNN successfully closed cnndn.com, but legal action from the Bush campaign led to increased publicity for Exley's site and set legal precedent that has allowed political websites to operate without Federal Election Commission regulation. In response to GWBush.com, then-candidate George W. Bush called Exley a "garbage man" and said he believed the website should be forced to shut down, explaining (in a bushism) "There ought to be limits to freedom."

Exley previously managed Revolution in Jesusland, a blog that sought to create dialog between the secular left and groups within Evangelical Christianity that promote economic and social justice as a matter of faith.

After the 2016 United States Presidential election, Exley, Saikat Chakrabarti, a former fellow Bernie Sanders presidential campaign executive, Kyle Kulinski of Secular Talk and Cenk Uygur of The Young Turks created the Justice Democrats to reform the Democratic Party and challenge President Donald Trump. Exley co-founded Middle Seat, which worked extensively with Justice Democrats.

References

External links
 Revolution in Jesusland(.com) - Exley's blog on new Evangelical politics. Archived from the original on Aug 22, 2008.
 Exley's blog posts at Huffington Post

1969 births
Living people
American political consultants
Wikimedia Foundation staff members